Surgibox is a portable inflatable operating theatre designed to provide a safe and sterile surgical environment for use in settings such as disaster relief areas, humanitarian efforts, and remote combat zones.

History 
The Surgibox was invented by Debbie Lin Teodorescu, a doctor, after seeing need to be able to perform urgent surgeries in the absence of an operation theatre when she was working in response to the 2010 Haiti Earthquake.

Design & Function 
The patented Surgibox design is used primarily for abdominal, chest, pelvic and orthopedic, surgical procedures. The Surgibox is designed to be portable. 

The Surgibox inflated using solar-powered and uses renewable batteries. It weighs less than 5 kilograms and can be transported in a 30-litre backpack. 

The SurgiBox sticks to human skin using adhesives, the skin and the plastic bubble form a sterile space, and surgeons can operate through entry ports on the side of the device.

The Surgibox enclosure keeps the sterile space well within the safety limits of operation theatres and also protects healthcare workers from fluids.

It is designed primarily for abdominal, chest, pelvic and orthopedic, surgical procedures. It is cost effective for and is designed for use in military and emergency humanitarian settings.

Awards 

 UK Design Museum Design Of the Year finalist
 Harvard Innovations Lab's President's Challenge Grand Prize
 MassChallenge winner

References 

Surgery
Medical devices
Surgical instruments